The Wishing Tree is a 1976 Georgian drama film directed by Tengiz Abuladze. It won the Lenin Prize, the All-Union Film Festival main prize and other prizes. The film is based on Giorgi Leonidze's short stories.

The textures of folk legend and striking visual allegory permeate The Wishing Tree, an episodic pastorale set in a pre-revolutionary Georgian village and spanning four seasons in the lives of various village characters. Some twenty-two stories are woven into the narrative, which centers on a beautiful young woman who is forced to marry a man she does not love; her unsanctioned love for another leads her to ritual disgrace and sacrifice.

Cast

Music
The film score is composed by Georgian composers Bidzina Kvernadze and Iakob Bobokhidze.

Awards
The film won several film festival prizes.

References

External links
 
 

1976 films
1977 drama films
1977 films
Soviet drama films
Georgian-language films
Kartuli Pilmi films
Films directed by Tengiz Abuladze
Soviet-era films from Georgia (country)
Drama films from Georgia (country)
1976 drama films